Putty Insavilla Armein (born 24 October 1981 in Palembang, South Sumatra) is an Indonesian ten-pin bowler. She finished in 8th position of the combined rankings at the 2006 AMF World Cup. During the final round she finished in 8th position as well. Her father name is Haji Armein Yuspar and her mother name is Irma Alfat. She won two gold and two bronze medals for Indonesia bowling national team in 2005 Southeast Asian Games in Manila.

She won two gold medals and two silver medals in Asian Bowling Cup in 2006. Additionally, she won a silver medal in the Asian Games 2006 in Doha, Qatar.

External links
Putty Armein news in abf-online
Putty Armein news in Kompas.com
Putty Armein news in Metrotvnews.com

Living people
1981 births
Indonesian ten-pin bowling players
People from Palembang
Asian Games medalists in bowling
Bowlers at the 2006 Asian Games
Bowlers at the 2010 Asian Games
Bowlers at the 2014 Asian Games
Bowlers at the 2018 Asian Games
Asian Games silver medalists for Indonesia
Asian Games bronze medalists for Indonesia
Medalists at the 2006 Asian Games
Medalists at the 2010 Asian Games
Medalists at the 2014 Asian Games
Southeast Asian Games gold medalists for Indonesia
Southeast Asian Games bronze medalists for Indonesia
Southeast Asian Games silver medalists for Indonesia
Southeast Asian Games medalists in bowling
Competitors at the 2005 Southeast Asian Games
20th-century Indonesian women
21st-century Indonesian women